Provincial Road 310 (PR 310) is a short provincial road in the southeast corner of Manitoba, Canada.

PR 310 runs from PTH 12 at South Junction to the United States border, where it connects with Minnesota State Highway 310, which leads to the city of Roseau. The Roseau–South Junction Border Crossing is lightly traveled and used mostly by local residents.

References

External links 
Manitoba Official Map

310